"Your Mama Don't Dance" is a hit 1972 song by the rock duo Loggins and Messina.  Released on their self-titled album Loggins and Messina, it reached number four on the Billboard pop chart and number 19 on the Billboard Easy Listening Chart as a single in early 1973.

Overview

This song, whose refrain and first verse is done in a blues format, deals with the 1950s and 1960s lifestyle concerning the generation gap, where the parents oppose the Rock and Roll Revolution of the younger generation, which includes the rebelliousness against the old society that monitors curfews on dating; as well as being arrested for making love with a girl in the back seat of a car during a drive-in movie, which happens during the bridge section of the song.

When released as a single, it was the duo's biggest hit as well as their only Gold single.

"Your Mama Don't Dance" was covered in 1973 by Australian band the Bootleg Family Band, which made the top 5 in Australia. It was also covered in 1985 by the rock band Y&T.

Elvis Presley included the song in a medley of rock n' roll songs on his 1974 album Elvis Recorded Live on Stage in Memphis.

Poison cover

In 1988, the glam metal band Poison recorded a cover of "Your Mama Don't Dance." It appeared as the ninth track on their second album Open Up and Say...Ahh! by Capitol Records and was released as the album's fourth single. The Poison version reached number 10 on the Billboard Hot 100 and number 39 on the Mainstream rock charts and has since gone Gold in the US. The song also charted at number 21 on the Australian charts and number 13 on the UK Singles chart. The single's B-side is "Tearin' Down the Walls".

Critical reception
Cash Box said "Take a classic Loggins & Messina rock/blues song, and play. It’s an instant hit." Reviewer of Record Mirror was disappointed by this single. He found it ″completely naff″ when contrasted with "Every Rose Has Its Thorn", the band's previous ″quite listenable hit″. Jerry Smith from British music newspaper Music Week also expressed an opinion that this "ordinary slice of good-time rock'n'roll" is "highly unlikely to enhance their reputation as wild, heavy rockers". Pan-European magazine Music & Media described the song as "energetic version" of traditional 12 -bar with a vague doo-wisp edge. In 2017, Billboard and OC Weekly ranked the song number six and number five, respectively, on their lists of the 10 greatest Poison songs.

Albums
"Your Mama Don't Dance" is on the following albums:
 Loggins and Messina
 The Best of Friends
 The Best: Sittin' in Again

Kenny Loggins's 1993 Solo Album:
 Outside: From the Redwoods

The Poison version is available on:
 Open Up and Say...Ahh!
 Swallow This Live (live version)
 Poison's Greatest Hits: 1986-1996
 Crack a Smile...and More! (Unplugged)
 The Best of Poison: 20 Years of Rock
 Open Up and Say...Ahh! - 20th Anniversary Edition
 Poison'd

The Y&T version is available on:
 Down for the Count

The Elvis version can be heard on:
 Elvis Recorded Live on Stage in Memphis

Personnel

Loggins & Messina version
 Kenny Loggins - vocals, electric guitar (plus solo)
 Jim Messina - vocals, electric guitar
 Jon Clarke - baritone saxophone
 Al Garth - alto saxophone
 Larry Sims - bass, backing vocals
 Merel Bregante - drums, backing vocals
 Michael Omartian - piano
 Milt Holland - congas, cowbells

Poison version
 Bret Michaels - Lead Vocals, Acoustic Guitar, Backing Vocals  
 C.C. DeVille - Lead Guitar, Rhythm Guitar (Used in the choruses and sporadically in the verses), Backing Vocals 
 Bobby Dall - Bass, Backing Vocals 
 Rikki Rockett - Drums, Backing Vocals

Charts

Weekly charts
Loggins and Messina version

Poison version

Year-end charts
Loggins and Messina version

Poison version

References

External links
 Lyrics of this song

1972 singles
1989 singles
Loggins and Messina songs
Poison (American band) songs
Songs written by Kenny Loggins
Song recordings produced by Tom Werman
1972 songs
Capitol Records singles
Songs written by Jim Messina (musician)
Columbia Records singles
Enigma Records singles
Songs about dancing
Rock-and-roll songs